Jaffal may refer to:
 Jaffal, Khuzestan
 Jaffal-e Pain, Khuzestan Province
 Jaffal, West Azerbaijan
 Jaffal Rural District, in Khuzestan Province